Mahua Roy Choudhury (24 September 1958 – 22 July 1985) was an Indian actress who is recognized for her work in Bengali cinema. She is considered to be one of the most successful actresses of Bengali Cinema. She received several awards including a Filmfare Award. She was posthumously conferred with the Best Actress Award for her role in Aadmi Aur Aurat (1984) at the 5th Damascus International Film Festival in 1987.

Personal life

Roychoudhury was born on 24 September 1958. Her original name was Shipra Roy Choudhury. Director Tarun Majumdar named her ‘Mahua’. Tarun Majumdar discovered her and Sandhya Roy groomed her. Mahua Roy Choudhury was from a lower-middle-class family of Dum Dum. Her father Nilanjan Roy Chowdhury was a dancer.

So from her childhood she had the knack of dancing. She could not pursue her studies due to the economic instability of her family. Meanwhile, she made her acting debut in Tarun Majumdar's Sriman Pritthiraj (1972). She had also shared screen with matinee idol Uttam Kumar in some films notable amongst being Seyi Chokh, Bagh Bondi Khela etc. She had produced hit films pairing with actors like Deepankar De, Santu Mukhopadhyay, Samit Bhanja, Anup Kumar, Tapas Paul, Chiranjeet, Kaushik Banerjee, Ranjit Mallick, Prosenjit Chatterjee and even with the legend Sri Uttam Kumar. Her next-door girl type acting made her popular in Bengali household. Actresses Sabitri Chatterjee, Sandhya Roy groomed her acting skills which further improvised her acting style. Very few actresses of her time knew classical as well as modern dance so well. Mahua infused the art of dancing successfully in her films, a quality quite rare in those days.

She married actor Tilak Chakraborty on 2 May 1976. They had one son named Tamal.

Her outstanding performance in Tapan Sinha's Aadmi Aur Aurat with Amol Palekar won her critical acclaim that corrected her reputation of merely filling up the box office coffers. There was even a time when Bengali films used to run by her name only. Within a very short span of time Mahua had met with huge success and popularity. She almost by herself had put the Bengali cinema on a comeback trail with Lal Golap in 1983.

Death
In the midnight of 22 July 1985, Mahua met with a fire accident at her residence, getting serious burns and succumbed to death owing to the injury. The exact cause of the fire accident remains a mystery. 

She had nearly around 15 films running on her shoulder at the time of her death. Many of her films were released after her death like Anurager Choya, Prem O Paap, Abhimaan, Ashirbaad, Kenaram Becharam , Abir etc. The whole industry grieved on her sudden demise. Police was unable to find out the exact cause behind her death.

Awards

Filmography
This list is incomplete; you can help by expanding it.

Sriman Prithviraj (1973) - Amala Bala (Roy) Mukherjee
Je Jekhane Dariye (1974)
Raja (1974)
Bagh Bondi Khela (1975, revised in 1989) - Dolon Bose
Sei Chokh (1976)
Dampati (1976)
Anandamela (1976) 
Jiban Morur Prante (1976)
Asamay (1976)
Ajashra Dhanyabad (1976)
Chhotto Nayak (1977)
Kabita (1977)
Behula Lokhindar (1977)
Seshraksha (1977)
Babumoshai (1977)
Pratishruti (1977)
Ranger Saheb (1978)
Ghatkali (1979)
Dub De Mon Kali Bole (1979)
Daksha Joggo (1979)
Dour (1979)
Mother (1979)
Bono Basar (1979)
Ei to Sangsar (1979)
Satma (1979)
Paka Dekha (1980) - Aparna
Priyatama (1980)
Subarnalata (1980)
Kalo Chokher Tara (1980)
Sei Sur (1980)
Sesh Bichar (1980)
Parabesh (1980)
Dadar Kirti (1980)
Upalabdhi (1981)
Subarna Golak (1981)
Pratishodh (1981)
Kalankini (1981)
Surya Sakshi (1981)
Saheb (1981) - Bulti
Kapalkundala (1981)
Father (1981)
Bodhon (1981)
Aaj Kal Porshur Galpo (1981)
Subha Rajani (1982)
Iman Kalyan (1982) - Mallika
Sonar Bangla (1982)
Amrita Kumbher Sandhane (1982)
Shathe Sathang (1982)
Faisala (1982)
Utsarga (1982)
Matir Swargo (1982)
Jabanbondi (1983)
Din Jai (1983)
Rajeshwari (1984)
Prayaschitta (1984)
Lal Golap (1984)
Parabat Priya (1984)
Shatru (1984)
Jog Biyog (1985)
Aadmi Aur Aurat (1985, TV Movie)
Aloy Phera (1985)
Amar Prithibi (1985)
Neel Kantha (1985)
Paroma (1985)
Sandhya Pradip (1985)
Till Theke Tal (1985)
Madhumoy (1985)
Anurager Chowa (1986)
Kenaram Becharam (1986)
Prem O Paap (1986)
Abhimaan (1986)
Dadu Nati o Hati (1986)
Jeeban (1986)
Shapmukti (1986)
Ashirbad (1986)
Madhumoy (1986)
Raj Purush (1987)
Lalan Fakir (1987)
Abir (1987)
Jawab (1987)
Jagoron (1990)
Sankranti (1990)
Rangbaaz (1993)
Jekhane Ashroy (2009) - (final film role)

References

External links
 

1958 births
1986 deaths
Actresses in Bengali cinema
Indian film actresses
20th-century Indian actresses